2,5-diketocamphane 1,2-monooxygenase (2,5-diketocamphane lactonizing enzyme, ketolactonase I, 2,5-diketocamphane 1,2-monooxygenase oxygenating component, 2,5-DKCMO, camphor 1,2-monooxygenase, camphor ketolactonase I) is an enzyme with systematic name (+)-bornane-2,5-dione,NADH:oxygen oxidoreductase (1,2-lactonizing). This enzyme catalyses the following chemical reaction

 (+)-bornane-2,5-dione + O2 + NADH + H+  (+)-5-oxo-1,2-campholide + NAD+ + H2O

2,5-diketocamphane 1,2-monooxygenase is a flavoprotein (FMN) which requires Fe2+.

References

External links 
 

EC 1.14.13